Major Samuel Foster  (7 December 1931 – 19 August 2014) was an Ulster Unionist Party (UUP) politician who served in the Northern Ireland Executive from 1998 to 2002, and was a Member of the Legislative Assembly (MLA) for Fermanagh and South Tyrone from 1998 to 2003.

Foster was educated at Enniskillen Technical College and the Ulster Polytechnic, and was by profession a Social Worker. He was a Special Constable in the Ulster Special Constabulary for 21 years and was an Officer with the rank of Major in the Ulster Defence Regiment until his election to Fermanagh District Council in 1981. He retired from the Council in 2001 having been Chairman in 1995–97. He was highly commended for his efforts to rescue victims of the 1987 Remembrance Day bombing, of which he was nearly a victim himself.

He was elected to the Northern Ireland Forum for Political Dialogue in 1996 for Fermanagh & South Tyrone and was elected to the Northern Ireland Assembly in 1998. In 1999 he was appointed Environment Minister by the David Trimble, reportedly as a reward not only to Foster for his long service, but to Fermanagh UUP for their support of Trimble. However, Foster was forced to resign in 2002 with the advancement of Parkinson’s Disease. He was succeeded by Dermot Nesbitt.

Having been a member of the Northern Ireland Police Authority from 1982 to 1985, he was appointed to the Northern Ireland Policing Board in 1999 on which he remained until it was reconstituted in 2006. He stood down from the Assembly at the 2003 elections.

Family
He was married with three children and was a lifelong member of the Orange Order in Fermanagh. A nephew of Foster's is married to former  Democratic Unionist Party (DUP) Leader & First Minister, Arlene Foster. Foster died on 19 August 2014, aged 82.

References

1931 births
2014 deaths
Members of Fermanagh District Council
Ulster Defence Regiment officers
Ulster Unionist Party MLAs
Ulster Special Constabulary officers
Members of the Northern Ireland Forum
Northern Ireland MLAs 1998–2003
Ministers of the Northern Ireland Executive (since 1999)
Commanders of the Order of the British Empire
People from Lisnaskea
Politicians from County Fermanagh
Military personnel from County Fermanagh